Ferment is the debut studio album by English alternative rock band Catherine Wheel, released 9 June 1992 by Fontana Records. Produced by Tim Friese-Greene and John Lee, the album combined aspects of shoegazing, alternative rock and neo psychedelia. Ferment is the only album to contain the neo psychedelia element of the bands discography. Their next album, Chrome, produced with famed alternative rock producer Gil Norton, shifted the musical direction of the band. While Ferment was originally not all that successful in the charts, the album continues to be well received by critics and fans, even 30 years after its release.

Promotion and release 
Four songs from the album – "Shallow", "I Want to Touch You", "She's My Friend" and "Salt" – had previously appeared on independently released 12" EPs, and were re-recorded for inclusion on the album.

The album's lead single, "Black Metallic", reached No. 9 on the Billboard Modern Rock Tracks chart and its video earned heavy rotation on MTV.

Limited numbers of the UK version came with a three-track live EP, recorded at Bath Moles Club on 6 November 1991.

The album was reissued in March 2010, containing bonus tracks (including the 1992 30th Century Man EP and both sides of the "Balloon" single) and extensive sleeve notes.

Reception 

PopMatters described Ferment as "the band's most unique record". Trouser Press wrote: "With soaring choruses and producer Tim Friese-Greene's shimmering textures, the entire album—both delicate and demonstrative—sparkles and smolders."

In 2016, Pitchfork ranked the album at No. 23 on its list of "The 50 Best Shoegaze Albums of All Time", with reviewer Ben Cardew commenting that "a good half of the songs on Ferment [...] are enduring shoegaze-disco classics, while 'Black Metallic', in its full seven-minute glory, makes a strong claim to being the genre's 'Stairway to Heaven'." In 2017, Paste ranked the album at No. 6 on its list of "10 Shoegaze Albums for People Who Don't Like Shoegaze".

Track listing

Singles
 "She's My Friend"
 12" vinyl
 "She's My Friend" – 4:29
 "Upside Down" – 3:13
 "Wish" – 3:10
 "Salt" – 3:54
 "Painful Thing"
 12" vinyl, CD
 "Shallow" – 3:27
 "Spin" – 2:44
 "Painful Thing" – 3:59
 "I Want to Touch You" – 5:05
"Black Metallic" 
 CD, 12" vinyl
 "Black Metallic" – 7:16
 "Crawling Over Me" – 5:39
 "Let Me Down Again" – 3:17
 "Saccharine" – 5:49
 7" vinyl
 "Black Metallic (Edit)" – 4:09
 "Let Me Down Again" – 3:17
 US promo CD
 "Black Metallic" – 7:16
 "Black Metallic (UK Edit)" – 4:09
 "Black Metallic (KROQ Edit)" – 5:30
 "Let Me Down Again" – 3:17
"Balloon"
 CD
 "Balloon (Edit)" – 3:56
 "Intravenous" – 3:31
 "Let Me Down Again (Live)" – 3:06
 "Painful Thing (Live)" – 6:21
 12" vinyl
 "Balloon" – 4:14
 "Intravenous" – 3:31
 "Let Me Down Again (Live)" – 3:06
 "Painful Thing (Live)" – 6:21
 7" vinyl
 "Balloon (Edit)" – 3:56
 "Intravenous" – 3:31
 "I Want to Touch You"
 CD
 "I Want to Touch You (Remix)" – 4:35
 "Ursa Major Space Station" – 5:04
 "Collideoscopic" – 4:07
 "Our Friend Joey" – 1:30
 12" vinyl 1
 "I Want to Touch You (Remix)" – 4:35
 "Dead Girl Friend" – 4:27
 "Ursa Major Space Station" – 5:04
 "Half Life" – 3:53
 12" vinyl 2
 "I Want to Touch You (Original Demo)" – 5:04
 "Black Metallic (Original Demo)" – 4:04
 "Wish (Original Demo)" – 3:09
 7" vinyl
 "I Want to Touch You (Remix)" – 4:35
 "Ursa Major Space Station" – 5:04
 "30 Century Man"
 CD, 12" vinyl
 "30 Century Man" (Scott Walker cover) – 5:19
 "Free of Mind" – 3:33
 "That's When I Reach for My Revolver" (Mission of Burma cover) – 4:07
 "Don't Want to Know If You Are Lonely" (Hüsker Dü cover) – 3:31

Personnel
Catherine Wheel
Rob Dickinson – guitar, vocals
Brian Futter – guitar, vocals
Dave Hawes – bass
Neil Sims – percussion
Technical
Tim Friese-Greene – producer
John Lee – producer, engineer
Tim Palmer – mixing
Alastair Thain – photography

References

External links 

 

1992 debut albums
Catherine Wheel albums
Fontana Records albums
Albums produced by Tim Friese-Greene